Dom Constantino of Braganza (1528–1575) was a Portuguese nobleman, conquistador, and administrator of the Portuguese Empire. Born a member of the powerful House of Braganza, he is best known for having served as Viceroy of Portuguese India and for initiating the Portuguese conquest of Sri Lanka.

Biography
He was the son of Dom James, 4th Duke of Braganza from his second marriage to Joana of Mendoça, daughter of Diogo of Mendonça, High-Alcaide of Mourão.

When he was 19 years old, he was appointed by King Dom John III of Portugal as his special ambassador to the baptism ceremony of King Henry II of France's son.

In 1558, he was appointed by the regent Dona Catherine of Habsburg (King Dom John III's widow) as the 20th Governor of Portuguese India, using also the title of 7th Viceroy. He left Lisbon on 7 April 1558 and arrived in Goa on 3 September.

He was a remarkable organiser of the local State, and he conquered Daman, Ceylon (nowadays known as Sri Lanka) and the island of Manar.

A first expedition, led by Viceroy Dom Constantino de Bragança in 1560, failed to subdue Jaffna, but captured Mannar Island.  By June 1619, despite sharp resistance from Cankili II of Jaffna, there were two Portuguese expeditions; a naval expedition that was repulsed by the Malabari corsairs and another expedition by Dom Filipe de Oliveira and his land army of 5,000, which defeated Cankili and conquered Jaffna, strengthening Portuguese control of shipping routes through the Palk Strait.

His government in India took three years and eight days, and during that period he made important reforms. He was considered by the historian C. R. Boxer one of the most fanatic Portuguese governors of India together with Dom Francisco Barreto (1555–1558).

He protected the poet Luis Vaz de Camões, during his stay in India.

He was later governor of Ribeira Grande, in the island of Santo Antão, Portuguese Cape Verde, from 1562.

Dom Constantino afterwards returned to the Kingdom. There he married his cousin, D. Maria de Melo, daughter of the 1st Marquess of Ferreira and 1st Count of Tentúgal, D. Rodrigo de Melo, and Dona Brites de Menezes (daughter of Dom Antão de Almada, 3rd Count of Avranches). The couple had no issue. King Sebastian of Portugal thought, in 1571, to appoint him as perpetual viceroy of India, but he refused.

Tooth relic
According to Mutu Coomara Swamy, Constantino claimed to play a part in capturing and destroying the Tooth-Relic of Gotama Buddha, during the wars of the Portuguese. The native authorities however, maintained the relic was kept safe from harm.

Ancestry

See also
House of Braganza
Duke of Braganza
Portuguese India
List of colonial heads of Portuguese India
 Relics associated with Buddha#Relics in Sri Lanka
 Relic of the tooth of the Buddha
 Gaspar Jorge de Leão Pereira

References

Nobreza de Portugal e do Brasil – Vol. II, page 443. Published by Zairol Lda., Lisbon 1989.

External links
 Genealogy of Constantino of Braganza, in Portuguese
 "Constantino de Bragança" in Christian-Muslim Relations. A Bibliographical History, vol. 7, eds. David Thomas and John Chesworth, Leiden - Boston, Brill, 2015, pp. 841-845.

|-

1528 births
1575 deaths
Colonial heads of Cape Verde
Viceroys of Portuguese India
Portuguese colonial governors and administrators
House of Braganza
16th-century Portuguese people